Bhilai is a city in Durg district of the Indian state of Chhattisgarh, in eastern central India. With population exceeding 1 million, it is the second-largest urban area in Chhattisgarh after Raipur. Bhilai is a major industrial city as well as an education hub of central India. The Bhilai metropolis contains three municipal corporations: Bhilai Municipal Corporation, Bhilai-Charoda Municipal Corporation and Risali Municipal Corporation.

The city is home to several industries like Bhilai Steel Plant, Jaypee Cement, Orient Cement, NSPCL Bhilai Power Plant, Steel Authority of India, FSNL and ACC Cement. The city is home to Indian Institute of Technology Bhilai. Jama Masjid in Bhilai is one of the largest mosques in India. The state's oldest zoo is Maitri Bagh in Bhilai.

Etymology 
It is believed that the name "Bhilai" is derived from the Bhil tribe which originally inhabited this region and continues to dwell in the nearby forests until today. The Bhilai word meaning is Bhils came (Bhil= Tribe, Ai= Came).

History 
Bhilai was a small village and a part of the Haihaiyavansi Kingdom until 1740 when it was conquered by the Marathas. 

The foundation of the modern city of Bhilai was laid in 1955 when the Indian government signed a historic agreement with the Soviet Union in Magnitogorsk to establish a steel plant near the village. The first blast furnace of the plant was commissioned in 1959 by the first president of India, Dr. Rajendra Prasad.

Demographics

Population 
In the 2011 census, Bhilai Nagar Urban Agglomeration had a population of 1,064,222, of which 545,916 are males and 518,306 are females. Bhilai has an average literacy rate of 86.63%, male literacy is 92.22% and, female literacy is 80.71%.

Geography 
Bhilai lies at 21.21°N 81.38°E in Central India at an elevation of 297m above sea level on the banks of the Shivnath river, a tributary of the river Mahanadi. It covers an area of 341 km2 (132 sq mi).

According to the Bureau of Indian Standards, the town falls under seismic zone 2, in a scale of 2 to 5 (in order of increasing value of vulnerability to earthquakes)

Climate 
Owing to its proximity to the Tropic of Cancer, Bhilai has a tropical climate. There are three main seasons: summer, monsoon, and winter. The average annual temperature in Bhilai is 26.6 °C and the city receives an average rainfall of 1188 mm in a year. Summers usually last from May to June, followed by monsoons in July and August. The town receives the bulk of rainfall in July, with an average rainfall of 352mm. There is little rainfall during the winters, with November being the driest month of the year.

Economy
Bhilai is home to the Bhilai Steel Plant, the first and largest Indian plant to produce steel rails. The inauguration of the first blast furnace of Bhilai Steel Plant was done by then president of India Dr. Rajendra Prasad, which was established with help from the Soviet Union in 1955.

Iron ore from Rajhara, limestone from Nandini, coal from Jharia, manganese from Balaghat, electric power from the Kosa thermal power plant, and water from the Tandula Canal, all nearby, are used in the Bhilai Steel Plant to manufacture rails and structural steel. Pig iron and billets are supplied to foundries and rolling mills located at Kumhari and other sites in central India. 

The number of steel rails produced by the facility till 2007 can go around the circumference of the earth 7.5 times. This is depicted on the monument at the globe square in the heart of the city. The facility underwent modernization and expansion and is amongst the leading manufacturers of iron and steel in Asia.

Education 

The city serves as an educational hub in the region, with a total of 59 universities and colleges, like Indian Institute of Technology (IIT) Bhilai, Chhattisgarh Swami Vivekanand Technical University, Bhilai Institute of Technology, Chandulal Chandrakar Memorial Government Medical College, Shri Shankaracharya Institute of Medical Sciences, Rungta Group Of Institutions, St. Thomas College, Shri Shankaracharya Group of Institutions, Christian College of Engineering & Technology, Kalyan College, Sector 7, Bhilai and CSIT Engineering College.

Schools in Bhilai are run either by municipal corporations or privately by entities, trusts, and corporations. The majority of schools are affiliated with the Chhattisgarh Board of Secondary Education and the Central Board of Secondary Education.

Transport

Roadways
The twin city of Durg-Bhilai is well connected with a network of national and state highways. Some major highways passing through the city are National Highway 53 (NH-53), SH-7 till Bemetara and SH-22 till Abhanpur. The proposed Durg–Raipur–Arang Expressway will start from Durg and will pass near the outskirts of Bhilai till Arang, which after completion, will enhance connectivity and commute in the state.

Rail
There are total 15 railway stations in the twin city that includes railway stations serving adjacent and minor neighbourhoods within the city. The main stations are Bhilai Power House railway station and Durg Junction railway station, which are major railway stations, with Durg being the biggest and the busiest, lying on the Howrah–Nagpur–Mumbai line.

Bus transport
The Durg Bus Station is a hub with buses plying to any place in and around Chhattisgarh as well as other parts of the country, with daily bus services operated by private and government buses to all cities within the state and outside the state, like Bhubaneswar, Nagpur, Jharsuguda, Varanasi, Prayagraj, Kolkata, Patna, Ranchi, Hyderabad, Jabalpur, Visakhapatnam, among others.

Metro
A light rail, Metrolite or Lite Metro (as referred in India), has been proposed by the Government of Chhattisgarh, which will pass from Naya Raipur to Durg via Raipur and Bhilai.

Air
In recent years, it has been considered for the airport to be developed to handle commercial operations, and make it a domestic airport.

Notable people

 Teejan Bai, Pandvani singer
 Anurag Basu, Bollywood director
 Anupama Bhagwat, sitar player
 Umesh Kumar Sahu, "Kaun Banega Crorepati", Season 9 winner
 Rajesh Chauhan, a former cricketer in the Indian cricket team
 Budhaditya Mukherjee, sitar player
 Amit Sana, runner-up in Indian Idol 1
 Tejal Shah (born 1979), visual artist, curator
 Krishnamurthy Subramanian, 17th Chief Economic Adviser to the Government of India

See also 
 List of cities in Chhattisgarh
 Chhattisgarh

References 

 
Metropolitan cities in India
Company towns in India